Heiligenkopf is a mountain of Baden-Württemberg, Germany. It is located in Zollernalbkreis, Germany.

Mountains and hills of the Swabian Jura
Zollernalbkreis